Caccobius  may refer to:
 Caccobius (beetle), a genus of beetles in the family Scarabaeidae
 Caccobius (fungus), a genus of fungi in the family Thelebolaceae